Kuh Kan-e Sofla (also Romanized as Kūh Kan-e Soflá; also known as Kūh Kan, Kūh Kan-e Pā’īn, and Kukan) is a village in Ab Bar Rural District, in the Central District of Tarom County, Zanjan Province, Iran. At the 2006 census, its population was 145, in 33 families.

References 

Populated places in Tarom County